The T-class was a class of six trams built by Duncan & Fraser, Adelaide for the Melbourne, Brunswick & Coburg Tramway Trust (MBCTT) as numbers 13-18. All passed to the Melbourne & Metropolitan Tramways Board on 2 February 1920 when it took over the MBCTT. They were then designated T-class and renumbered 177-182.

Preservation
One has been preserved:
180 by the Tramway Museum Society of Victoria

References

Melbourne tram vehicles
600 V DC multiple units